Bandise Grey Maku (born 24 July 1986) is a former South African professional rugby union player, whose usual position was hooker.

Career

Youth

Bulls
He was first named in a  squad during the 2006 Vodacom Cup. He made his Currie Cup debut the following season, coming on as a 72nd-minute substitute against .

Lions
He was injured for the entire 2012 Super Rugby season, but did play some Currie Cup rugby at the end of the season.

Kings

Return to Bulls

South Africa national team
His first tour of duty for his country was with the Springboks to France, Italy, Ireland & England in late 2009, where he played in tour matches against the Leicester Tigers and Saracens. He earned his first test cap for his country playing against Italy during an incoming tour in 2010. In 2010, Maku was again called up for duty with the Springboks in a November tour of Ireland, Wales, Scotland and England. His call came two matches into the tour on 18 November 2010, after a controversial incident in which two other Springbok players tested positive for a banned substance.

Honours
 2009 Currie Cup winner 
 2010 Super Rugby winner 
 2011 Currie Cup winner

References

South African rugby union players
South Africa international rugby union players
Bulls (rugby union) players
Blue Bulls players
Golden Lions players
Lions (United Rugby Championship) players
Eastern Province Elephants players
Southern Kings players
Living people
1986 births
Sportspeople from Qonce
Tshwane University of Technology alumni
Rugby union players from the Eastern Cape
Rugby union hookers